The Master of the Dresden Prayerbook was an anonymous master illuminator active in Flanders between 1460 and 1520. He is named after the manuscript now in the State Library of Saxony. Over fifty manuscripts are attributed to him.

References

Further reading
 

Manuscript illuminators

Dresden Prayerbook
Early Netherlandish painters
16th-century Flemish painters